Dangerous Ways (Swedish: Farliga vägar) is a 1942 Swedish drama film directed by Anders Henrikson and starring Henrikson, Karin Ekelund, Georg Rydeberg and Ernst Eklund. The film's sets were designed by the art director Bertil Duroj.

Synopsis
A family of refugees arrive in Stockholm but find life very hard when the father cannot get a work permit and they are short of money.

Cast
 Karin Ekelund as 	Vanja
 Anders Henrikson as 	Martin
 Georg Rydeberg as 	Stefan
 Ernst Eklund as 	Katena
 Hilda Borgström as 	Anna
 Frank Sundström as 	Carel
 Maj-Britt Håkansson as 	Sonja Katena
 Ivar Kåge as Ship Owner
 Gösta Cederlund as 	Green, Lawyer
 Hjördis Petterson as Hostess
 Torsten Winge as Prant
 Marianne Löfgren as Miss Kahlén
 Carl Barcklind as 	District Rural Judge 
 Josua Bengtson as 	Stuveriförman
 Astrid Bodin as 	Waitress 
 Gösta Bodin as 	Klädhandlare
 Siv Ericks as 	Green's Maid 
 John Ericsson as Crew Hand
 David Erikson as 	Passkontrollant
 Gösta Grip as 	Tullkontrollant
 Olle Hilding as 	Prant's Co-worker 
 Torsten Hillberg as 	C.G. Ceder
 Willy Peters as 	Policeman 
 Ragnar Widestedt as 	Källarmästare

References

Bibliography 
 Qvist, Per Olov & von Bagh, Peter. Guide to the Cinema of Sweden and Finland. Greenwood Publishing Group, 2000.
 Wright, Rochelle. The Visible Wall: Jews and Other Ethnic Outsiders in Swedish Film. SIU Press, 1998.

External links 
 

1942 films
Swedish drama films
1942 drama films
1940s Swedish-language films
Films directed by Anders Henrikson
Films set in Stockholm
1940s Swedish films